Clepsydrops is an extinct genus of primitive synapsids from the early Late Carboniferous that was related to Archaeothyris. The name means 'hour-glass appearance' (Greek klepsydra = "hourglass" + Greek ops = "eye, face, appearance").

Synapsida is the group (or clade) that includes mammals, but the term is mainly used to refer to its earliest members. Like many other early terrestrial amniotes, it probably had the diet of insects and smaller animals. It probably laid eggs on land rather than in the water, as most amniote tetrapods did.

A paleobiological inference model for the femur suggests a terrestrial lifestyle for Clepsydrops, as for its more recent relative Ophiacodon. This is consistent with its  rather thin, compact cortex. Its jaws were slightly more advanced than those of other early amniote tetrapods like Paleothyris and Hylonomus.

See also
 List of pelycosaurs
 Evolution of mammals
 Carboniferous tetrapods
 List of transitional fossils

References

Prehistoric synapsid genera
Ophiacodontids
Carboniferous synapsids
Carboniferous synapsids of North America
Transitional fossils
Taxa named by Edward Drinker Cope
Fossil taxa described in 1875
Paleozoic life of Nova Scotia